Ayalathe Sundari is a 1974 Indian Malayalam film, directed by Hariharan and produced by G. P. Balan. The film stars Prem Nazir, Jayabharathi(Aishwarya Rai) ,Srividya and Raghavan in the lead roles. The film has musical score by Shankar–Ganesh and S. D. Burman.

Cast

Prem Nazir as Ravi
Jayabharathi as Shreedevi
Srividya as Malini
Raghavan as Venu
Adoor Bhasi as Gopal/Palgo
Prema as Karthyani
Sankaradi as Kuttan Nair
Shobha
Sreelatha Namboothiri as Pappi
T. R. Omana as Saraswathi Amma
T. S. Muthaiah as Panicker
Bahadoor as Pappu Pilla
K. P. Ummer as Damu
Khadeeja as Pushokasa
Meena as Meenakshi
Sadhana as Margosa
Sudheer

Soundtrack
The music was composed by Shankar–Ganesh and S. D. Burman and the lyrics were written by Mankombu Gopalakrishnan and Anand Bakshi.

References

External links
 

1974 films
1970s Malayalam-language films
Films scored by Shankar–Ganesh
Films directed by Hariharan